Shogo Kubo (September 19, 1959 – June 24, 2014) was a Japanese American skateboarding pioneer and one of the original members of the Z-Boys that formed in Venice, California in 1975.

Born in Kagoshima city, Japan, Kubo first tried skateboarding when he was six years old on a very rudimentary toy skateboard, and after falling he did not try it again until seeing someone skateboarding outside his judo class when he was 12. Kubo moved to the United States at a relatively young age without any knowledge of the English language. For his inability to speak English, he was teased and thought of as "slow".

When he moved to the United States, he took an interest in surfing. He became friends with Jay Adams after responding to a newspaper ad about a surfboard Adams was selling. Kubo used Adams's skateboard, which eventually led to his passion for skateboarding and his joining the Z-Boys. His style was widely respected by his peers. He influenced future pro-skateboarders such as Christian Hosoi and was featured in the Dogtown photos of Glen E. Friedman.

Shogo left the competitive scene in the 1980s, later moving to Hawaii where he got married and had two children. In the 2005 American biographical drama film Lords of Dogtown, Kubo was portrayed by pro skateboarder Don Nguyen. Kubo designed a sneaker for Nike in 2007, the Nike SB "Shogo" Blazers. Kubo had worn Nike Blazers while skateboarding since the 1970s.

Death
Kubo died at age 54; he was found unresponsive while paddleboarding in the water at a surf spot off Portlock Point in Hawaii Kai, Honolulu. Later reports indicate he died of a brain aneurysm.  At the time of his death he was working as a tour agent, and was survived by his wife Michiyo, son Shota, daughter Meagan H., brothers Yoshifumi and Shinya, and sister Reiko Masuda.

References

External links
Interview with Shogo Kubo

2014 deaths
1959 births
American skateboarders
American sportspeople of Japanese descent
People from Kagoshima
Japanese emigrants to the United States